Goodenia eatoniana  is a species of flowering plant in the family Goodeniaceae and is endemic to the extreme south-west of Western Australia. It is a perennial herb with lance-shaped leaves at the base of the plant, egg-shaped stem leaves, and racemes of blue flowers.

Description
Those on the stem are stem-clasping, egg-shaped and smaller.

Taxonomy and naming
Goodenia eatoniana was first formally described in 1874 by Ferdinand von Mueller in Fragmenta Phytographiae Australiae. In 1990, Roger Charles Carolin selected specimens probably collected by John Forrest near the Blackwood River as the lectotype. The specific epithet (eatoniana) honours Henry Francis Eaton (1831–1912), a supporter of scientific activities in Victoria.

Distribution and habitat
This goodenia grows in winter-wet flats and drainage lines in the Jarrah Forest, Swan Coastal Plain and Warren biogeographic regions in the extreme south-west of Western Australia.

Conservation status
Goodenia eatoniana is classified as "not threatened" by the Government of Western Australia Department of Parks and Wildlife.

References

eatoniana
Eudicots of Western Australia
Plants described in 1874
Taxa named by Ferdinand von Mueller
Endemic flora of Western Australia